Zac Niringiye (born 1954) is a Ugandan Anglican theologian and pastor.

Biography 
Niringiye was born in Bufumbira. After a first degree in physics and a teaching diploma at Makerere University, Niringiye completed an MA at Wheaton College, Illinois in 1987 and a PhD at the University of Edinburgh in 1998, studying under T. Jack Thompson and David Kerr.

Niringiye worked as regional director for the Church Missionary Society, promoting missionary work in the whole of Africa. He was then consecrated Assistant Bishop of Kampala in 2005, taking an early retirement in 2012 to advocate for social justice in Uganda.

References

1954 births
Living people
People from Kisoro District
21st-century Anglican bishops in Uganda
Anglican bishops of Kampala
Wheaton College (Illinois) alumni
Makerere University alumni
Alumni of the University of Edinburgh